Janet Ong'era  is the Kisii County Woman Member of the National Assembly in the Republic of Kenya. She is the Chairperson of  the Eastern Africa Region at the Pan African Parliament.

She is an advocate of the High Court of Kenya and the Managing Partner in the law firm Ongera and Company.

From the year 2013 - 2017 Janet Ong'era was nominated by her Party The Orange Democratic Movement to serve as a Senator in the 11th Parliament. At the senate she was the Minority Deputy Whip and a member of The Kenyan Delegation to the Pan African Parliament.
Janet Ong'era served as the Executive Director of the Orange Democratic Movement and during her tenure she successfully conducted party primaries of which her Political Party Orange Democratic Movement won 95 Parliamentary and 3380 civics seats in 2007 General Elections and won 118 Parliamentary seats and 367 members of the County Assembly in 2013 General Elections. Janet Onge'ra was also the director of the two Kenyan Constitution referendums conducted in 2005 and 2010, and both polls were won by her team.

Janet Ong'era is the Founder and Patron of Kisii County Women Agribusiness Empowerment (KCWAES), a savings and credit cooperative society that empowers women to grow and transform their economic status. She has a number of initiatives that are aimed at empowering the Kisii County Society.

References 
3. http://www.parliament.go.ke/the-national-assembly/hon-ongera-janet

4. https://info.mzalendo.com/person/janet-ongera/

5. http://www.kewopa.org/?page_id=854

Living people
Year of birth missing (living people)
Members of the 11th Parliament of Kenya
21st-century Kenyan women politicians
21st-century Kenyan politicians
Orange Democratic Movement politicians
People from Kisii County